Veche was a popular assembly in medieval Slavic countries.

In Novgorod and in Pskov, where the veche acquired great prominence, the veche was broadly similar to the Norse thing or the Swiss Landsgemeinde.

Etymology
The word is inherited from Proto-Slavonic *větje , meaning 'council', 'counsel' or 'talk' (which is also represented in the word "soviet", both ultimately deriving from Proto-Slavic verbal stem of *větiti 'to talk, speak').  There is a relation to "-vice" in "advice", and somewhat more distantly to Sanskrit "Veda", Germanic words like "wise" (English), "weten" (Dutch, "to know"), "witch" (Slavonic: věšt-ica) and many others, which however come from a different Indo-European root.  Likewise, there exists misinformation claiming that the semantic derivation that yields the meaning of the word under consideration is parallel to that of congregation. The contemporary words svedeniya and svidchennya both meaning "information" are cognates of this word.

Early Slavs
Procopius of Caesarea mentioned Slavic people gathering in popular assemblies already in the 6th century:
But when the report was carried about and reached the entire nation, practically all the Antae assembled to discuss the situation, and they demanded that the matter be made a public one(...).  For these nations, the Sclaveni and the Antae, are not ruled by one man, but they have lived from of old under a democracy, and consequently everything which involves their welfare, whether for good or ill, is referred to the people.

Rus' 
The East Slavic veche is thought to have originated in tribal assemblies of Eastern Europe, thus predating the Rus' state.
The earliest mentions of  veche in East European chronicles refer to examples in Belgorod (now Bilhorod-Kyivskyi) in 997, Novgorod in 1016, in Kiev in 1068, in Pskov in 1123. The assemblies discussed matters of war and peace, adopted laws, and called for and expelled rulers. In Kiev, the veche was summoned in front of the Cathedral of St Sophia.

In Ukraine, the town viche was simply a gathering of community members to inform everybody of important events (vich-na-vich - eye-to-eye) and come up with a collective planning for the near future.

Novgorod Republic 
 

The veche was the highest legislative and judicial authority in the Novgorod Republic until 1478, after the conquest of Novgorod by Grand Prince Ivan III.

The traditional scholarship goes on to argue that a series of reforms in 1410 transformed the veche into something similar to the public assembly of Republic of Venice; it became the Commons or lower chamber of the parliament. An upper Senate-like Council of Lords (sovet gospod) was also created, with title membership for all former city magistrates (posadniks and tysyatskys). Some sources indicate that veche membership may have become full-time, and parliament deputies were now called vechniks. Some of the more recent scholars call this interpretation into question.

The Novgorod assembly could be presumably summoned by anyone who rang the veche bell, although it is more likely that the common procedure was more complex.  The whole population of the city—boyars, merchants, and common citizens—then gathered at Yaroslav's Court or in front of the Cathedral of Holy Wisdom (the latter called a Vladychnoe veche – "An Archbishop's Veche," since it was called in front of the cathedral). The veche bell was a symbol of republican sovereignty and independence and for this reason, Ivan III carted it off to Moscow when he took control of the city, to show that the old way of doing things was at an end.

Separate assemblies could be held in the kontsy (boroughs or "ends") of Novgorod.

Of all other towns of Novgorod Land, the chronicles only mention a veche in Torzhok, however possibly they existed in all other towns as well.

Pskov Republic 
The veche of Pskov Republic had legislative powers, it could appoint military commanders and hear ambassadors' reports. It also approved expenses such as grants to princes and payments to builders of walls, towers and bridges. Veche gathered in the court of the Trinity Cathedral, which held the archives of the veche and important private papers and state documents. The veche assembly included posadniks (mayors), "middle" and common people. The historians differ on the extent to which the veche was dominated by the elites, with some saying that the real power was in the hands of boyars and others considering veche a democratic institution. Conflicts were common and the confrontation between the veche and the posadniks in 1483-1484 led to the execution of one posadnik and to the confiscation of the property of three other posadniks who fled to Moscow.

The veche functioned until 1510, when that city was taken over by Grand Prince Vasili III (1505–1533).

Poland

Veches, known in Poland as wiece, were convened even before the beginning of the Polish statehood in the Kingdom of Poland. Issues were first debated by the elders and leaders, and later presented to all the free men for a wider discussion.

One of the major types of wiec was the one convened to choose a new ruler. There are legends of a 9th-century election of the legendary founder of the Piast dynasty, Piast the Wheelwright, and a similar election of his son, Siemowit, but sources for that time come from the later centuries and their validity is disputed by scholars. The election privilege was usually limited to the elites, which in the later times took the form of the most powerful nobles (magnates, princes) or officials, and was heavily influenced by local traditions and strength of the ruler. By the 12th or 13th century, the wiec institution likewise limited its participation to high ranking nobles and officials. The nationwide gatherings of wiec officials in 1306 and 1310 can be seen as precursors of the Polish parliament (the General Sejm).

See also
 Zemsky Sobor (Russian parliament from the early modern period)
 Duma
 Ting in Scandinavia, Sejm in Poland, Seimas in Lithuania, Saeima in Latvia
 Rada (later kind of popular assembly, then the parliament of Ukraine)

Notes 
 See the Slavic etymology of the word and the corresponding references in the following entries of the Max Vasmer's Etymological dictionary:
 of the particular word вече/veche ,
 of the basic root вѣт- ,
and the possible further Indo-European etymology of this root in the entry
 *wAit- (-th-),
all of them presented online in the etymological databases of The Tower of Babel project.

References

Further reading
 Michael C. Paul, "The Iaroslavichi and the Novgorodian Veche: A Case Study on Princely Relations with the Veche," Russian History (2004).

Historical legislatures
Popular assemblies
Novgorod Republic
Slavic culture
Society of Kievan Rus'
History of Poland during the Piast dynasty
History of Ruthenia